Herbert Blau (May 3, 1926 – May 3, 2013) was an American director and theoretician of performance. He was named the Byron W. and Alice L. Lockwood Professor in the Humanities at the University of Washington.

Early life and career

Blau earned his bachelor's degree in chemical engineering from New York University (1947). Later, he earned his master of arts in drama (1949) and doctorate in English and American literature (1954), both from  Stanford University.

As co-founder (with Jules Irving) of The Actor's Workshop in San Francisco (1952–1965) and co-director of the Repertory Theater of Lincoln Center in New York City (1965–67), Blau introduced American audiences to avant garde drama in some of the country's first productions of Samuel Beckett, Jean Genet, and Harold Pinter including the 1957 performance of Beckett's Waiting for Godot at California's San Quentin State Prison. This was the  Godot that during the second red scare, after extralegal State Department maneuvers denied travel permission for unstated political reasons to a member of the company, represented American theater at the 1958 Brussels World's Fair.

In 1968, Blau signed the "Writers and Editors War Tax Protest" pledge, vowing to refuse tax payments in protest against the Vietnam War.

In 1968, Blau was named founding provost and dean of the School of Theatre and Dance of the California Institute of the Arts (CalArts), where he led the way in designing its educational model. With president Robert W. Corrigan, Blau recruited faculty including artists Allan Kaprow, John Baldessari, and Nam June Paik, composers Mel Powell and Morton Subotnick, musician Ravi Shankar,  ethnomusicologist Nicholas England, designers Peter de Bretteville and Sheila Levrant de Bretteville, choreographer Bella Lewitzky, director Alexander Mackendrick, film scholar Gene Youngblood, filmmaker Pat O'Neill, and animation artist Jules Engel.

In 1971, after three years at CalArts, Blau moved to Oberlin College, where he formed the experimental theater group KRAKEN, with which he continued presenting challenging productions for another decade. The two books that emerged from that work—Take Up the Bodies: Theater at the Vanishing Point (University of Illinois Press, 1982) and Blooded Thought: Occasions of Theater (Performing Arts Journal Publications, 1982)—received the George Jean Nathan Award for Dramatic Criticism. In 1974, Blau became the Dean of the Division of Arts and Humanities at the University of Maryland Baltimore County (UMBC), bringing KRAKEN with him. While there, he saw a young Kathleen Turner perform and persuaded her to transfer to UMBC. After a contentious tenure, Blau resigned in 1976.

In addition to the theater, Blau has taken up the subjects of literature, visual arts, fashion, postmodern culture, and politics.

CalArts conferred an honorary doctor of arts degree to Blau in May 2008.

Personal life
Blau was born in Brooklyn. He married actress Beatrice Manley in 1949 and they divorced in 1980. They had three children: film professor Dick Blau, Tara Gwyneth Blau, and Dr. Jonathan Blau. Blau married a second time to  Kathleen Woodward and they had one daughter, Jessamyn Blau.

Death
Blau died on his 87th birthday, May 3, 2013, in Seattle, Washington from cancer. He is survived by his wife, Kathleen Woodward, three children from his first marriage,  a daughter from his second marriage,  seven grandchildren, and three great-grandchildren.

Books
Blau, Herbert. Programming Theater History: The Actor's Workshop of San Francisco. New York: Routledge, 2013.  (paperback)  (hardcover)
Blau, Herbert. As If: An Autobiography, Volume 1. Ann Arbor: University of Michigan Press, 2011.  (hardcover)  (paperback)  (ebook)
Blau, Herbert. Reality Principles: From the Absurd to the Virtual. Ann Arbor: University of Michigan Press, 2011.  (paperback)  (hardcover)  (ebook)
Blau, Herbert. The Dubious Spectacle: Extremities of Theater, 1976-2000. Minneapolis: University of Minnesota Press, 2002.  (paperback)  (hardcover)
Blau, Herbert. Sails of the Herring Fleet: Essays on Beckett. Ann Arbor: University of Michigan Press, 2000.  (paperback)  (hardcover)  (ebook)
Blau, Herbert. Nothing in Itself: Complexions of Fashion. Bloomington: Indiana University Press, 1999.  (paperback)  (hardcover) 
Blau, Herbert. To All Appearances: Ideology and Performance. London/New York: Routledge,1992.  (paperback)  (hardcover)
Blau, Herbert. The Audience. Baltimore: Johns Hopkins University Press, 1990.  (paperback)  (hardcover)
Blau, Herbert. The Eye of Prey: Subversions of the Postmodern. Bloomington: Indiana University Press, 1987. 
Blau, Herbert. Take Up the Bodies: Theater at the Vanishing Point. Urbana: University of Illinois Press, 1982.  (paperback)  (hardcover) 
Blau, Herbert. Blooded Thought: Occasions of Theater. New York: Performing Arts Journal Publications, 1982. 
Blau, Herbert. The Impossible Theater: A Manifesto. New York: Macmillan, 1964; rpt. Collier, 1965.

References

External links

The documentary film, The Impossible Itself, covers Herbert Blau's 1957 production of Waiting for Godot and San Quentin State Prison.
Audio of Herbert Blau's lecture "The Right Side of the Tracks, from As If: An Autobiography" at the Walter Chapin Simpson Center for the Humanities on October 28, 2004.
The New York Public Library for the Performing Arts houses the program notes Herbert Blau wrote for productions of The Actor's Workshop of San Francisco and for the Repertory Theater of Lincoln Center, 1952-67. Correspondence and other documentary materials are also included in the archives.

1926 births
2013 deaths
People from Brooklyn
Writers from Seattle
Deaths from cancer in Washington (state)
New York University alumni
Stanford University alumni
American chemical engineers
University of Washington faculty
California Institute of the Arts faculty
San Francisco State University faculty
American tax resisters
American theater critics
American theatre directors
Journalists from New York City
Activists from New York (state)
Activists from California
Engineers from New York City
Scientists from New York City